A .pcf file can be profile configuration file or a configuration file for setting the client parameters in a virtual private network. The file is in INI file format and contains information about a VPN connection which is necessary for the client software, such as the username, password, tunneling port, DNS settings.

The .pcf-files were originally used for Cisco Systems VPN Client, but are now used also in other VPN systems to distribute configuration information to clients.

For different versions of VPN client software there are different .PCF files (It is different from other organization).

The .pcf extension is also used to indicate PreComp or a PreCompressed File. This file is basically a compressed file.

References

Cisco Systems
Configuration files